Salelu Warama (The Web of Love) is a 2002 Sri Lankan Sinhala drama film directed by Vasantha Obeysekera and produced by Soma Edirisinghe for EAP  Films. It stars Kamal Addararachchi and Sangeetha Weeraratne in lead roles along with Tony Ranasinghe and Saumya Liyanage. Music composed by Rohana Weerasinghe.

The film has based on a true story took place for 27 days in Horana and Akuressa areas. It is the 1165th Sri Lankan film in the Sinhala cinema.

Cast
 Kamal Addararachchi as Suren Galappaththi 
 Sangeetha Weeraratne as Priyanka
 Pradeep Senanayake as Sunil Gunasekara
 Tony Ranasinghe as Priyanka's Father
 Saumya Liyanage as Darshan
 Nayana Kumari as Vineetha
 Ramani Fonseka as Priyanka's mother
 Hemasiri Liyanage as Suren's father
 Janak Premalal as Suren's brother
 Nayani Maheshika as Suren's sister
 Srinath Maldeniya as Passport issuer
 Purna Sampath de Alwis as Suren's brother-in-law
 Asela Jayakody as Suren's roommate
 Gunawardena Hettiarachchi as Prosecutor
 Mike Anthony Fernando as Police OIC

References

2002 films
2000s Sinhala-language films